Pieve Fissiraga is a comune (municipality) in the Province of Lodi in the Italian region Lombardy, located about  southeast of Milan and about  south of Lodi.

Pieve Fissiraga borders the following municipalities: Lodi, Lodi Vecchio, Cornegliano Laudense, Borgo San Giovanni, Massalengo, Sant'Angelo Lodigiano, Villanova del Sillaro.

References

Cities and towns in Lombardy